Gilbert Buatère (c. 985 – 1 October 1018) was one of the first Norman adventurers in the Mezzogiorno. He was the eldest son of a petty, but rich, lord of Carreaux, near Avesnes-en-Bray in the region of Rouen. Carreaux gives his family, the Drengot, the alternate name of de Quarrel. 

In 1016, his brother Osmond, according to some sources, or Gilbert himself, according to others, killed one William Repostel, a relative of Duke Richard II of Normandy in revenge and the duke pardoned his life, but exiled him. Osmond and his four brothers—Gilbert, Asclettin, Ralph, and Ranulf—travelled to the Mediterranean to assist Melus of Bari and Guaimar III of Salerno, Lombards in revolt against Byzantine pretensions. In 1018, 250 Norman knights under Gilbert's command fought against the Greek general Basil Boioannes in the Battle of Cannae, a grave Norman defeat. Gilbert himself, along with Osmond, died in the battle: only ten knights survived.

Notes

Sources
Norwich, John Julius. The Normans in the South 1016-1130. Longmans: London, 1967.

Norman warriors
Italo-Normans
Normans killed in battle
11th-century Normans
980s births
1018 deaths
Year of birth uncertain